This is a list of wineries in the Eden Valley, a wine-producing region in South Australia which is located within the Barossa wine zone adjacent to the Barossa Valley wine region.

List

See also

South Australian wine
Eden Valley wine region
High Eden
List of wineries in the Barossa Valley
List of wineries in the Clare Valley
List of wineries in South Australia

References

Further reading

External links
Wine Australia
Wines of Australia
Wine Diva

Eden Valley
Lists of places in Australia
Wineries in the Eden Valley